Ogin-dong (옥인동) is a dong (neighbourhood) of Jongno-gu in Seoul, South Korea. It is a legal dong (법정동 ), administered under its administrative dong (행정동 ), Hyoja-dong, of which it covers the westernmost part, until the fortress wall of Inwangsan.

Ogin-dong belongs to Seochon, Seoul's "Western village".

See also 
Administrative divisions of South Korea

References

External links
 Jongno-gu Official site in English
 Jongno-gu Official site
 Status quo of Jongno-gu by administrative dong 
 Hyoja-dong Resident office 
 Origin of Ogin-dong's name

Neighbourhoods of Jongno-gu